Leroy Harris Jr. (born June 6, 1984) is a former American football offensive guard. He was picked in the 4th round (115th overall) of the 2007 NFL Draft by the Tennessee Titans. He started 3 games prior to the 2010 NFL season. In 2010, he took over at guard for Eugene Amano who replaced Kevin Mawae. He is married and currently has 3 children Leroy III (14), Christian (10), and Lauren (8). Now, Leroy Harris works at the Christ Presbyterian Academy as a fitness coach and Offensive Line Coordinator for their football team.

1984 births
Living people
Players of American football from Raleigh, North Carolina
American football centers
American football offensive guards
NC State Wolfpack football players
Tennessee Titans players
Detroit Lions players